The 2007 Chelmsford Borough Council election took place on 3 May 2007 to elect members of Chelmsford Borough Council in England. This was on the same day as other local elections.

Results summary

Ward results

Bicknacre & East & West Hanningfield

Boreham & The Leighs

Broomfield & The Walthams

Chelmer Village & Beaulieu Park

Chelmsford Rural West

Galleywood

Goat Hall

Great Baddow East

Great Baddow West

The Lawns

Little Baddow, Danbury & Sandon

Marconi

Moulsham & Central

Moulsham Lodge

Patching Hall

Rettendon & Runwell

St. Andrew's

South Hanningfield, Stock & Margaretting

South Woodham - Chetwood & Collingwood

South Woodham - Elmwood & Woodville

Springfield North

Trinity

Waterhouse Farm

Writtle

References 

May 2007 events in the United Kingdom
2007 English local elections
2007
2000s in Essex